is a Japanese keiretsu descended from the Yasuda zaibatsu, Asano zaibatsu and Okura zaibatsu.  They are  major business grouping in Japan up to World War II. In 1948, Yasuda was dismantled, with its key financial arm Yasuda Bank becoming Fuji Bank.

The modern Fuyo Group was first developed in the early 1960s around Marubeni and Fuji Bank, paralleling the development of the DKB Group and Sanwa Group. Fuji Bank orchestrated the merger of Marubeni with Takashimaya in 1955 in order to create a strong trading company partner for Fuji's customers. Group presidents began meeting regularly in 1964. Unlike the keiretsu that developed from the Mitsubishi, Mitsui and Sumitomo zaibatsu remnants, the Fuyo Group was intended to be open to other businesses as well as legacy zaibatsu businesses.

Fuji Bank merged with Dai-Ichi Kangyo Bank and Industrial Bank of Japan in 2000 to form Mizuho Financial Group. Following the merger, the Fuyo Group became centered on Marubeni, Meiji Yasuda Life Insurance and Yasuda Fire & Marine Insurance (now Sompo Japan).

Fuyo is Japanese for "hibiscus" and is also used as an alternative name for Mount Fuji, the tallest mountain in Japan and the namesake for Fuji Bank.

Companies

Canon 
Hitachi 
JFE Holdings 
Kayaba Industry
Keikyu 
Maeda Corporation
Marubeni 
Matsuya 
Meiji Yasuda Life Insurance 
Mizuho Bank 
Mizuho Trust Bank 
Nichirei
Nippon Suisan Kaisha
Nissan 
Nisshinbo Industries
Nisshin Seifun Group
NSK Ltd.
Oki Electric Industry 
Palace Hotel, Tokyo
Penta-Ocean
Ricoh 
Sapporo Brewery
Showa Denko
Sompo Japan Insurance 
Taiheiyo Cement
Taisei Corporation
TOA Construction Corporation
Tobu Railway 
Yamaha

References

 
Conglomerate companies based in Tokyo
Keiretsu
Companies established in the 1960s
1960s establishments in Japan